The mutiny that took place at Fiji's Queen Elizabeth Barracks in Suva on 2 November 2000 resulted in the death of four loyal soldiers.  Four of the rebels were subsequently beaten to death after the rebellion had been quelled.

Bibliography
 Trnka, S. (2011). State of Suffering: Political Violence and Community Survival in Fiji. United States: Cornell University Press.,  
 Pretes, M. (2008). Coup: Reflections on the Political Crisis in Fiji. United States: ANU E Press.,  
Baba, T., Nabobo-Baba, U., Field, M. (2005). Speight of Violence: Inside Fiji's 2000 Coup. Australia: Pandanus Books.,  

2000 Fijian coup d'état
Politics of Fiji
Court-martial cases